The following is a list of Hamilton Tiger-Cats all time records and statistics for players current to the 2022 CFL season. This list includes all seasons since the Hamilton Tiger-Cats' inception in 1950 and does not include lineage figures from the Hamilton Tigers nor the Hamilton Wildcats. Each category lists the top six players, where known, except for when the sixth place player is tied in which case all players with the same number are listed. Aside from Grey Cup championship games played and won, this list includes only regular season statistics.

For records by head coaches, see List of Hamilton Tiger-Cats head coaches.

Grey Cup championships

Grey Cup games won
4 – Angelo Mosca, Tommy Grant, John Barrow, Chet Miksza, Garney Henley, Bob Krouse
3 – Pete Neumann, Zeno Karcz, Bill Danychuk, Joe Zuger, Gene Ceppetelli, Ellison Kelly, Hal Patterson

Grey Cup games played in
9 – John Barrow, Tommy Grant
8 – Angelo Mosca, Chet Miksza
7 – Pete Neumann, Garney Henley, Ralph Goldston, Zeno Karcz, Geno DeNobile

Tenure 

Most Games Played
296 – Paul Osbaldiston – (1986-2003)
216 – Garney Henley – (1960-75)
204 – Rocky DiPietro – (1978-91)
200 – Rob Hitchcock – (1995-2006)
192 – John Barrow – (1957-70)
184 – Pete Newmann – (1951-64)

Most Seasons Played
18 – Paul Osbaldiston – (1986-2003)
16 – Garney Henley – (1960-75)
15 – Chet Miksza – (1952-65, 68)
14 – Pete Newmann – (1951-64)
14 – John Barrow – (1957-70)
14 – Rocky DiPietro – (1978-91)

Scoring 

Most Points – Career
2856 – Paul Osbaldiston – (1986-2003)
1069 – Bernie Ruoff – (1980-87)
603 – Tommy Joe Coffey – (1967-72)
561 – Justin Medlock – (2011, 2014-15)
522 – Earl Winfield – (1987-97)
476 – Nick Setta – (2007-09)

Most Points – Season
233 – Paul Osbaldiston – 1989
212 – Paul Osbaldiston – 1990
203 – Paul Osbaldiston – 1999
197 – Justin Medlock – 2011
196 – Paul Osbaldiston – 1992
189 – Paul Osbaldiston – 1994

Most Points – Game
26 – Terry Evanshen – versus Ottawa Rough Riders, September 7, 1975
24 – Garney Henley – versus Saskatchewan Roughriders, October 15, 1962
24 – Kalin Hall – versus BC Lions, October 15, 1995
24 – Paul Osbaldiston – versus Ottawa Rough Riders, September 22, 1996
24 – Tony Akins – versus Winnipeg Blue Bombers, October 10, 1999
24 – Justin Medlock – versus BC Lions, October 22, 2011

Most Touchdowns – Career
87 – Earl Winfield – (1987-97)
62 – Brandon Banks – (2013-19, 2021)
56 – Garney Henley – (1960-75)
54 – Tommy Grant – (1956-68)
50 – Dave Flemming – (1965-74)
46 – Ronald Williams – (1998-2001)

Most Touchdowns – Season
17 – Chris Williams – 2012
16 – Brandon Banks – 2019
15 – Tony Champion – 1989
15 – Ronald Williams – 1999
15 – Ronald Williams – 2000
13 – Terry Evanshen – 1975
13 – Steve Stapler – 1987
13 – Earl Winfield – 1988
13 – Earl Winfield – 1990
13 – Earl Winfield – 1995
13 – Ronald Williams – 1998

Most Touchdowns – Game
4 – Garney Henley – versus Saskatchewan Roughriders, October 15, 1962
4 – Terry Evanshen – versus Ottawa Rough Riders, September 7, 1975
4 – Kalin Hall – versus BC Lions, October 15, 1995
4 – Tony Akins – versus Winnipeg Blue Bombers, October 10, 1999

Most Receiving Touchdowns – Career
75 – Earl Winfield – (1987-97)
51 – Tommy Grant – (1956-68)
45 – Rocky DiPietro – (1978-91)
44 – Brandon Banks – (2013-19, 2021)
42 – Garney Henley – (1960-75)
40 – Steve Stapler – (1981-88)

Most Receiving Touchdowns – Season
15 – Tony Champion – 1989
13 – Terry Evanshen – 1975
13 – Steve Stapler – 1987
13 – Earl Winfield – 1990
13 – Earl Winfield – 1995
13 – Brandon Banks – 2019

Most Receiving Touchdowns – Game
4 – Garney Henley – versus Saskatchewan Roughriders, October 15, 1962
4 – Terry Evanshen – versus Ottawa Rough Riders, September 7, 1975
4 – Tony Akins – versus Winnipeg Blue Bombers, October 10, 1999

Most Rushing Touchdowns – Career
43 – Ronald Williams – (1998-2001)
30 – Troy Davis – (2001-05)
29 – Gerry McDougall – (1957-66)
28 – Dave Flemming – (1965-74)
25 – Bernie Faloney – (1957-64) 
20 – Willie Bethea – (1963-70) 

Most Rushing Touchdowns – Season
14 – Ronald Williams – 1999
13 – Ronald Williams – 2000
13 – Ronald Williams – 1998
11 – Derrick McAdoo – 1989

Most Rushing Touchdowns – Game
3 – Many times

Most Punt Return Touchdowns – Career
11 – Earl Winfield – (1987-97)
7 – Brandon Banks – (2013-19)
5 – Ron Howell – (1954-62)
5 – Chris Williams – (2011-12)
3 – Wally Zatylny – (1988-95)

Most Punt Return Touchdowns – Season
5 – Chris Williams – 2012
4 – Earl Winfield – 1988
4 – Brandon Banks – 2015

Most Punt Return Touchdowns – Game
2 – Ron Howell – versus Toronto Argonauts, September 20, 1959
2 – Earl Winfield – versus Edmonton Eskimos, September 17, 1993
2 – Brandon Banks – versus Montreal Alouettes, Sun, November 23, 2014

Passing 

Most Passing Yards – Career
33,841 – Danny McManus – (1998-2005)
17,761 – Mike Kerrigan – (1986-96)
17,425 – Bernie Faloney – (1957-64) 
15,555 – Jeremiah Masoli – (2013-19, 2021)
13,467 – Tom Clements – (1979-83)
12,676 – Joe Zuger – (1962-71)

Most Passing Yards – Season
5367 – Henry Burris – 2012
5334 – Danny McManus – 1999
5209 – Jeremiah Masoli – 2018
5100 – Kevin Glenn – 2010
5034 – Danny McManus – 2004
4925 – Henry Burris – 2013

Most Passing Yards – Game
572 – Joe Zuger – versus Saskatchewan Roughriders, October 15, 1962
542 – Anthony Calvillo – versus Montreal Alouettes, October 25, 1996
525 – Danny McManus – versus Winnipeg Blue Bombers, June 25, 2004
518 – Anthony Calvillo – versus Saskatchewan Roughriders, October 6, 1996
513 – Danny McManus – versus Ottawa Renegades, July 25, 2002
506 – Kevin Glenn – versus Montreal Alouettes, October 18, 2009

Most Pass Completions – Career
2368 – Danny McManus – (1998–2005)
1274 – Mike Kerrigan – (1986–96)
1203 – Jeremiah Masoli – (2013-19, 2021)
1065 – Bernie Faloney – (1957–64) 
969 – Tom Clements – (1979–83)
936 – Kevin Glenn – (2009–11)

Most Pass Completions – Season
391 – Henry Burris – 2012
388 – Kevin Glenn – 2010
378 – Jeremiah Masoli – 2018
373 – Henry Burris – 2013
365 – Danny McManus – 1999
356 – Tom Clements – 1982

Most Pass Completions – Game
37 – Dieter Brock – versus Saskatchewan Roughriders, July 8, 1984
37 – Anthony Calvillo – versus Montreal Alouettes, October 25, 1996
37 – Henry Burris – versus Toronto Argonauts, November 1, 2012
36 – Anthony Calvillo – versus Birmingham Barracudas, July 15, 1995
36 – Dane Evans – versus Calgary Stampeders, June 18, 2022

Most Passing Touchdowns – Career
164 – Danny McManus – (1998-2005)
115 – Mike Kerrigan – (1986-96)
97 – Bernie Faloney – (1957-64) 
87 – Tom Clements – (1979-83)
80 – Jeremiah Masoli – (2013-19, 2021)
76 – Joe Zuger – (1962-71)

Most Passing Touchdowns – Season
43 – Henry Burris – 2012
33 – Kevin Glenn – 2010
29 – Danny McManus – 2004
28 – Danny McManus – 1999
28 – Jeremiah Masoli – 2018
27 – Tom Clements – 1981

Most Passing Touchdowns – Game
8 – Joe Zuger – versus Saskatchewan Roughriders, October 15, 1962

Combined Yards 

Most Combined Yards – Career
14,798 – Earl Winfield (67 RSH, 10,119 REC, 2,834 PR, 1,650 KR, 128 MFGR) – (1987–97)
13,686 – Brandon Banks (407 RSH, 5,678 REC, 3,049 PR, 3,773 KR, 779 MFGR) – (2013–19, 2021)
10,213 – Tommy Grant (559 RSH, 6,461 REC, 1,195 PR, 1,998 KR, 0 MFGR) – (1956–68)
9,818 – Rocky DiPietro (25 RSH, 9,761 REC, 3 PR, 29 KR, 0 MFGR) – (1978–91)
9,586 – Archie Amerson (356 RSH, 6,266 REC, 921 PR, 2,043 KR, 0 MFGR) – (1997–2005)
9,100 – Garney Henley (552 RSH, 4,657 REC, 2,944 PR, 947 KR, 0 MFGR) – (1960–75)

Rushing 

Most Rushing Yards – Career
5188 – Troy Davis – (2001-05)
4270 – Gerry McDougall – (1957-66)
3919 – Willie Bethea – (1963-70)
3703 – Ronald Williams – (1998-2001)
3467 – Jimmy Edwards – (1976-78)
3398 – Dave Fleming – (1965-74)

Most Rushing Yards – Season (all 1000 yard rushers included)
1628 – Troy Davis – 2004
1581 – Jimmy Edwards – 1977
1264 – Ronald Williams – 2000
1223 – Andy Hopkins – 1973
1207 – DeAndra' Cobb – 2009
1206 – Troy Davis – 2003
1173 – DeAndra' Cobb – 2010
1163 – Dave Buchanan – 1972
1143 – Troy Davis – 2002
1109 – Gerry McDougall – 1958
1053 – Gerry McDougall – 1957
1069 - Johnny Shepherd -1983
1046 – Jimmy Edwards – 1976
1039 – Derrick McAdoo – 1989
1025 – Ronald Williams – 1999
1010 - Gerry McDougall – 1959

Most Rushing Yards – Game
233 – Troy Davis – versus Toronto Argonauts, September 6, 2004
213 – Gerry McDougall – versus Montreal Alouettes, September 28, 1957
212 – Jesse Lumsden – versus Winnipeg Blue Bombers, August 3, 2007
187 – Éric Lapointe – versus Winnipeg Blue Bombers, July 8, 1999

Receiving 

Most Receiving Yards – Career
10,119 – Earl Winfield – (1987–97)
9,762 – Rocky DiPietro – (1978–91)
6,491 – Tommy Grant – (1956–68)
6,266 – Archie Amerson – (1997–2003)
5,796 – Darren Flutie – (1998–2002)
5,789 – Steve Stapler – (1981–88)

Most Receiving Yards – Season
1656 – Tony Champion – 1989
1550 – Brandon Banks – 2019
1516 – Steve Stapler – 1987
1496 – Earl Winfield – 1995
1426 – Mac Cody – 1996
1423 – Brandon Banks – 2018

Most Receiving Yards – Game
275 – Larry Thompson – versus Winnipeg Blue Bombers, August 25, 1995
272 – Arland Bruce – versus Saskatchewan Roughriders, July 31, 2010
257 – Tony Akins – versus Winnipeg Blue Bombers, October 10, 1999
228 – Hal Patterson – versus Saskatchewan Roughriders, October 15, 1962
225 – Craig Yeast – versus Toronto Argonauts, October 21, 2004
207 – Archie Amerson – versus Ottawa Renegades, July 25, 2002

Most Receptions – Career
706 – Rocky DiPietro – (1978–91)
573 – Earl Winfield – (1987–97)
455 – Luke Tasker – (2013–19)
431 – Archie Amerson – (1997–2004)
422 – Brandon Banks – (2013-19, 2021)
405 – Darren Flutie – (1998–2002)

Most Receptions – Season
112 – Brandon Banks – 2019
104 – Luke Tasker – 2017
101 – Andy Fantuz – 2016
98 – Darren Flutie – 1998
95 – Tony Champion – 1989
95 – Bralon Addison – 2019

Most Receptions – Game
16 – Arland Bruce – versus Saskatchewan Roughriders, July 31, 2010
15 – Andy Fantuz – versus Calgary Stampeders, October 1, 2016
13 – Brandon Banks – versus Ottawa Redblacks, October 27, 2017
12 – Prechae Rodriguez – versus Montreal Alouettes, October 13, 2008
12 – Jimmy Edwards – versus B.C. Lions, July 29, 1976
12 – Luke Tasker – versus Ottawa Redblacks, October 27, 2017

Interceptions 

Most Interceptions – Career
59 – Garney Henley – (1960-75)
36 – Rob Hitchcock – (1995-2005)
35 – Al Brenner – (1971-74)
35 – Don Sutherin – (1958-66)
33 – Less Browne – (1984-88)
32 – Ralph Goldston – (1956-64)

Most Interceptions – Season
15 – Al Brenner – 1972
12 – Paul Bennett – 1984
12 – Gerald Bess – 1985
12 – Less Browne – 1985
11 – Don Sutherin – 1961
11 – Al Brenner – 1971

Most Interceptions – Game
4 – Less Browne – versus Montreal Concordes, August 21, 1986
4 – Al Brenner – versus Toronto Argonauts, November 5, 1972
4 – Don Sutherin – versus Edmonton Eskimos, September 11, 1961

Quarterback sacks 

Most Sacks – Career
157 – Grover Covington – (1981–91)
115 – Joe Montford – (1996–2004)
81.5 – Mike Walker – (1982–89)
41 – Tim Cheatwood – (2002–06)
37 – Ted Laurent – (2014–19)
36 – Justin Hickman – (2009–11, 2014–15)

Most Sacks – Season
26 – Joe Montford – 1999
25 – Grover Covington – 1988
21 – Mike Walker – 1986
21 – Joe Montford – 1998
20 – Joe Montford – 2000
19 – Tim Cofield – 1993
19 – Joe Montford – 2001

Most Sacks – Game
5 – Tim Cofield – versus Toronto Argonauts, September 6, 1993
4 – Tim Cofield – versus Toronto Argonauts, July 22, 1993
4 – Joe Montford – versus Winnipeg Blue Bombers, October 29, 1999
4 – Eric Norwood – versus Edmonton Eskimos, September 20, 2014

Tackles 
 Note: Tackles were first recorded in 1987, but there was no differentiation between Defensive and Special Teams tackles. Those categorical differences were added in 1991.

Most Defensive tackles – Career
643 – Simoni Lawrence – (2013–19, 2021–22)
484 – Rob Hitchcock – (1995–2006)
424 – Joe Montford – (1996–2001, 2003-04)
420 – Jamall Johnson – (2009–13)
338 – Calvin Tiggle – (1996–99)
329 – Mike O'Shea – (1993–95, 2000)

Most Defensive tackles – Season
114 – Zeke Moreno – 2007
108 – Jamall Johnson – 2007
106 – Calvin Tiggle – 1999
105 – Larry Dean – 2018
105 – Jovan Santos-Knox – 2022
101 – Jamall Johnson – 2010

Most Defensive tackles – Game
17 – Simoni Lawrence – at Winnipeg Blue Bombers, September 27, 2019
15 – Calvin Tiggle – at B.C. Lions, October 19, 1999
14 – Markeith Knowlton – versus Montreal Alouettes, June 26, 2008
13 – Darrell Patterson – at Ottawa Rough Riders, August 9, 1990
13 – Calvin Tiggle – at Calgary Stampeders, July 20, 1996

Most Special Teams Tackles – Career
122 – Rob Hitchcock (1995–2006)
122 – Marc Beswick (2009–14)

Most Special Teams Tackles – Season
37 – Dylan Barker – 2009
27 – Marc Beswick – 2011
25 – Dean Noel – 1996

Most Special Teams Tackles – Game
7 – Terry Wright – versus Ottawa Rough Riders, September 14, 1991
6 – Paul Bushey – at Edmonton Eskimos, September 27, 2019

Field goals 

Most Field Goals – Career
655 – Paul Osbaldiston (1986–2003)
230 – Bernie Ruoff (1980–87)
135 – Justin Medlock (2011, 2014–15)
111 – Nick Setta (2007–09)
98 – Ian Sunter (1972–75) 
93 – Lirim Hajrullahu (2018–19)

Most Field Goals – Season
54 – Paul Osbaldiston – 1989
52 – Paul Osbaldiston – 1990
49 – Justin Medlock – 2011
47 – Paul Osbaldiston – 2001
47 – Lirim Hajrullahu – 2019
46 – Lirim Hajrullahu – 2018

Most Field Goals – Game
8 – Paul Osbaldiston – at Ottawa Rough Riders, September 22, 1996
7 – Paul Osbaldiston – at Saskatchewan Roughriders, July 6, 2001
7 – Justin Medlock – versus BC Lions, October 22, 2011

Highest Field Goal Accuracy – Career (minimum 75 attempts)
89.0% (135/152) – Justin Medlock (2011, 2014–15)
85.3% (93/109) – Lirim Hajrullahu (2018–19)
82.7% (67/81) – Luca Congi (2012–13)
79.9% (111/139) – Nick Setta (2007–09)
72.5% (655/903) – Paul Osbaldiston (1986–2003)

Highest Field Goal Accuracy – Season (minimum 40 attempts)
90.7% (39/43) – Seth Small – 2022
89.4% (42/47) – Justin Medlock – 2015
89.1% (49/55) – Justin Medlock – 2011
88.9% (40/45) – Luca Congi – 2012
85.5% (47/55) – Lirim Hajrullahu – 2019

Longest Field Goal
58 – Brett Maher – at Calgary Stampeders, October 1, 2016
58 – Seth Small – versus Toronto Argonauts, August 26, 2022
57 – Bernie Ruoff – at Calgary Stampeders, July 20, 1984
57 – Paul Osbaldiston – at Winnipeg Blue Bombers, November 4, 1990
57 – Paul Osbaldiston – at Calgary Stampeders, October 13, 1997
57 – Justin Medlock – at Montreal Alouettes, September 11, 2011
57 – Sergio Castillo – versus Toronto Argonauts, September 4, 2017

Most Consecutive Field Goals
24 – Luca Congi (August 16, 2012 – October 12, 2012)

References 
Hamilton Tiger-Cats Media Guide 2021
Hamilton Tiger-Cats Media Guide 2018 
Hamilton Tiger-Cats Media Guide 2011
CFL website

Hamilton Tiger-Cats lists
Canadian Football League records and statistics